Baghcheh (also Romanized as Bāghcheh) is a village in Rezvan Rural District, Kalpush District, Meyami County, Semnan Province, Iran. At the 2006 census, its population was 1,149, in 252 families.

References 

Populated places in Meyami County